Aleksander Täheväli (also Aleksander Sternfeld; 5 December 1888 Mäksa Parish, Tartu County - 30 January 1955 Stockholm) was an Estonian politician. He was a member of III Riigikogu.

References

1888 births
1955 deaths
Members of the Riigikogu, 1926–1929
Members of the Riigikogu, 1929–1932
Members of the Riigikogu, 1932–1934